Valentino "Tino" Francisco Livramento (born 12 November 2002) is an English footballer who plays as a right-back for Southampton.

Early life
Born in Croydon, Livramento joined Chelsea at under-9 level from local club Roundshaw. At Roundshaw he played as a striker. Growing up, he supported Chelsea. His father's side of the family comes from Portugal and his mother is Scottish.

Club career

Chelsea
He was named Chelsea academy player of the year for the 2020–21 season. Towards the end of the season, Livramento featured on the bench in Premier League fixtures against Manchester City and Arsenal.

In July 2021, contract talks between Chelsea and Livramento stalled, with rumours that the wing-back was set to leave the club. He was reportedly subject to interest from a host of English clubs, including South Coast rivals Southampton and Brighton & Hove Albion, as well as A.C. Milan and RB Leipzig.

Southampton
Having failed to reach an agreement with Chelsea, Livramento signed for fellow Premier League side Southampton in August 2021, with a reported buy-back clause of £25 million included. On 14 August 2021, Livramento made his first Premier League appearance for Southampton in a 3–1 defeat to Everton. On 23 October 2021, Livramento scored his first professional goal in Southampton's 2–2 draw with Burnley. On 24 April 2022, Livramento was ruled out for the remainder of 2022 following an ACL injury during Southampton’s 2–2 draw with Brighton.

International career
Despite Livramento representing England through the youth ranks up to Under-21 level, he is also eligible to play for the Scotland and Portugal national teams through his mother being Scottish and his father being Portuguese.

On 27 August 2021, Livramento received his first call up for the England U21s. On 7 September 2021, he made his England U21 debut during the 2–0 2023 UEFA European Under-21 Championship qualification win over Kosovo U21s at Stadium MK.

Career statistics

Club

Honours

Individual 

 Chelsea Academy Player of the Year: 2020–21

References

2002 births
Living people
Footballers from Croydon
English people of Portuguese descent
English footballers
England youth international footballers
England under-21 international footballers
Portuguese footballers
Association football defenders
Chelsea F.C. players
Southampton F.C. players
Premier League players
English people of Scottish descent